Papyrus Oxyrhynchus 227 (P. Oxy. 227 or P. Oxy. II 227) is a fragment of the Oeconomicus of Xenophon, written in Greek. It was discovered in Oxyrhynchus. The manuscript was written on papyrus in the form of a roll. It is dated to the first century. Currently it is housed in the British Library (Department of Manuscripts, 785) in London.

Description 
The document was written by an unknown copyist. It contains the text of the Oeconomicus (VIII,17 – IX,2) of Xenophon. The measurements of the fragment are 260 by 120 mm. The text is written in a round uncial hand resembling that of the British Library Papyrus CCLXXI, which contains the third book of the Odyssey. Textually it is corrupt in some places, although it also sometimes preserves good readings. A few corrections were made by a second hand, mostly the insertion of the iota adscript.

It was discovered by Grenfell and Hunt in 1897 in Oxyrhynchus. The text was published by Grenfell and Hunt in 1899.

See also 
 Oxyrhynchus Papyri
 Papyrus Oxyrhynchus 226
 Papyrus Oxyrhynchus 228

References 

227
1st-century manuscripts
British Library collections